Whispering Pines is an unincorporated community in Okeechobee County, Florida, United States. It is a suburb of Okeechobee, located to its north on US 441.

Geography
Whispering Pines is located at  (27.2772, -80.8397).

References

Unincorporated communities in Okeechobee County, Florida
Unincorporated communities in Florida